Lobbyist, originally titled Angel, was a 2007 South Korean television series produced by Korea Pictures International, Inc. that aired on SBS. It starred Song Il-gook, Han Jae-suk and Jang Jin-young (in her last performance).

Plot
Lobbyist centers around a fictional love story caught in the real-world scenario of international politics, secret weapons trading, and deadly lobbying activities.

Kang Tae-hyuk is a successor of a main munitions business company in Korea. He has an innate ability as a lobbyist and is a master schemer. His exploits take him to the United States where he deals with the mafia. He plans to sweep over the whole of Asia.

Cast
Song Il-kook as Harry / Kim Joo-ho
Lee Hyun-woo as young Joo-ho
Jang Jin-young as Maria / Yoo So-young
Nam Ji-hyun as young So-young
Han Jae-suk as Kang Tae-hyuk
Huh Joon-ho as James Lee
Kim Mi-sook as Madam Chae
Yoo Sun as Eva / Yoo Moon-young
Park Eun-bin as young Moon-young
Choi Ja-hye as Karen / Kim Soo-ji
Kim Sung-kyum as Chairman Kang, Tae-hyuk's father
Lee Jae-yong as Jang Tae-sung, Mi-ran's father
Jung Yoon-jo as Jang Mi-ran
Sung Ji-ru as Yoo Sung-shik, Maria and Eva's father
Lee Mi-young as Kim Jung-soon, Maria and Eva's mother
Kim Da-hyun as Andy, Madam Chae's son
Sung Chang-hoon as Yang Dong-jin
Jun-seong Kim as Michael
Choi Min as "Yankee"
Bang Gil-seung as Park So-ja
Kim Yang-woo as "Brown Bear"
Kim Seo-ra as Maggie, Harry's aunt
Lee Seung-hyung as Kang Tae-joon, Tae-hyuk's stepbrother
Lee Jin-ah as Reporter Song
Manny Oliverez as mafia thug
Devin Rumer as mafia thug
John J. Quinn as Luciano
Brian Townes as Jack
James Nalitz as butler
Jefferson Smith as chauffeur
Park Ji-yeon as friend of deaf daughter (bit part, ep 21-22)

Ratings

Source: TNmS Media Korea

References

External links
Lobbyist official SBS website 

2007 South Korean television series debuts
2007 South Korean television series endings
Korean-language television shows
Television shows written by Choi Wan-kyu
Seoul Broadcasting System television dramas
South Korean action television series
South Korean romance television series
Television series by Chorokbaem Media